The gamma-ray burst coordinates network (GCN) is a system that distributes information about the location of a gamma-ray burst (GRB), called notices, when a burst is detected by various spacecraft. The GCN also automatically receives and distributes messages, called circulars, about follow-up observations to interested individuals and institutions. Follow-up observations may be made by ground-based and space-based optical, radio, and X-ray observatories.

GCN has its origins in the BATSE coordinates distribution network (BACODINE). The Burst And Transient Source Experiment (BATSE) was a scientific instrument on the Compton Gamma-Ray Observatory (CGRO), and BACODINE monitored the BATSE real-time telemetry from CGRO. The first function of BACODINE was calculating the right ascension (RA) and declination (dec) locations for GRBs that it detected, and distributing those locations to sites around the world in real-time. Since the de-orbiting of the CGRO, this function of BACODINE is no longer operational. The second function of BACODINE was collecting right ascension and declination locations of GRBs detected by spacecraft other than CGRO, and then distributing that information. With this functionality, the original BACODINE name was changed to the more general name GCN.

GCN data flow
The GCN data flow starts when gamma-rays from a GRB hit a detector on a spacecraft. The spacecraft sends the GRB location information down to a ground station, which in turn relays it to the GCN at the NASA Goddard Space Flight Center. At GSFC the location information is processed by GCN with custom hardware and software, and then Notices are sent to users via socket connection, e-mail, and pagers. Those users may then schedule follow-up observations of the GRB, and send refined information about the GRB back to the GCN.

In the case of Swift, the GRB location information follows the same path, except it is transmitted from Swift up to a TDRS satellite, and then down to the White Sands Complex (WSC). From WSC, the location information is sent to GSFC via a domestic communications satellite (DOMSAT).

GCN notices
The following spacecraft, and instruments where noted, are sources of real-time GCN information:

High Energy Transient Explorer (WMM and SXC)
INTErnational Gamma-Ray Astrophysics Laboratory (INTEGRAL)
InterPlanetary Network (IPN) Position Notices from WIND (Konus) and Ulysses.
Rossi X-ray Timing Explorer (PCA and ASM)
Swift provides data products not previously available from prior missions, including spectra, images, and lightcurves.

Past spacecraft and instruments that participated in GCN include Array of Low Energy X-ray Imaging Sensors (ALEXIS), BeppoSAX, the Imaging Compton Telescope (COMPTEL) on CGRO, and the X-Ray/Gamma-Ray Spectrometer (XGRS) on NEAR Shoemaker.

GCN circulars
The GCN system has the capability to receive and distribute timely information on GRBs called GCN Circulars. Users e-mail their reports to a central location and then those reports will be automatically sent to an e-mail distribution list. This list of Circular recipients is completely separate from the list of Notice recipients. The GCN Observation Report Circulars allow the GRB follow-up community to make optimum use of limited resources, such as labor and telescope time, by communicating what has already been done or will soon be done.

Future plans for GCN
To maximize the utility of the GCN system, GCN will make whatever modifications are necessary to incorporate and distribute GRB location information from new spacecraft and instruments as they become active. GCN will also expand its operations to include information about any astrophysical transients, including non-GRBs such as the extreme-ultraviolet transients detected by the ALEXIS spacecraft. Future spacecraft that will be distributing GRB locations via GCN include AGILE and Gamma-ray Large Area Space Telescope.

External links
GCN Homepage at GSFC

Gamma-ray telescopes
Gamma-ray bursts
Astrophysics